The Ker are a Muslim Rajput community found in the state of Gujarat in India and a province of Sindh in Pakistan. They are one of a number of communities of pastoral nomads found in the Banni region of Kutch.

History and origin

The Ker claim descent from the Samma Rajputs of Sindh. According to their traditions, the word in ker in Sindhi means a dreadful sin. Their ancestor Mania came to Kutch in the thirteenth century. He was involved in a murder of royal prince of Kutch, and as such he and his descendants became known as the Ker, i.e., the committer of a dreadful sin.

Present circumstances

The community is concentrated in the talukas of Bhuj, Abdasa and Lakhpat in Kutch District of Gujarat, and the neighbouring districts of Badin and Tharparkar in Sindh.  They have three sub-divisions, the Mamda, Manai and Mode, all of which have equal status. The Ker are endogamous, but do on occasion marry into other Samma communities such as the Aboda, Darad, Mandra, Mokhaji and Padiar. Historically, there were cases of intermarriage with the historically semi-Islamized Hindu Jadeja community, but this custom has ended.

The Ker are pastoral Maldhari nomads, raising buffaloes, cows and sheep, and graze these in the Banni region. They also sell milk to Bhuj. They often migrate to Saurashtra to graze their cattle. Like many other Kutchis, the Ker have migrated to other parts of India in search of work. The traditional headmen of the tribe, the Jaam have converted to Hinduism, and this has led to a rupture of the relationship of the tribe with their headman.

See also
Samma

References

Social groups of Gujarat
Tribes of Kutch
Maldhari communities
Muslim communities of India
Sindhi tribes
Sindhi tribes in India
Muslim communities of Gujarat